Megateg elegans is a species of spiders in the family Zoropsidae. It is from Queensland.

References 

 Megateg elegans at the World Spider Catalog

Zoropsidae
Spiders described in 2005
Spiders of Australia
Arthropods of Queensland